Emily Tapp (born 10 June 1991) is an Australian wheelchair Paralympic athlete and triathlete. She was selected to represent Australia at the 2016 Rio Paralympics in athletics but was forced to withdraw before the Games due to a burns injury. She represented Australia at the 2020 Summer Paralympics in paratriathlon.

Personal
On 8 January 2011 Tapp had a campdrafting fall that left her a paraplegic. The accident resulted in her spending eight months in hospital and three years of rehabilitation. Tapp grew up on a remote cattle property in the Northern Territory. She was a boarder at Fairholme College in Toowoomba, Queensland and graduated at the end of 2010. In 2020, the NSW Court of Appeal has dismissed an appeal from Tapp, who had sustained catastrophic injuries while competing in a campdraft competition organised by a not-for-profit community sports association, the Australian Bushmen's Campdraft & Rodeo Association. But in 2021, the High Court of Australia ordered the Australian Bushmen's Campdraft & Rodeo Association to pay Tapp $6.75m in damages.

In 2015, she was undertaking a Bachelor of International Business and Finance at University of Southern Queensland.

Paratriathlon
In 2015, she won her first paratriathlon by winning the PT1 class at the OTU Oceania Paratriathlon Championships at Penrith, New South Wales.

Tapp was disappointed that the Women's PT1 event was not on the 2016 Rio Paralympics paratriathlon program.

At the 2020 Tokyo Paralympics, Tapp crashed into a barrier during the opening stages of the bike leg of the PTWC, rendering her bike unridable and forcing her to withdraw from the event.

International results
2015 – Penrith OTU Paratriathlon Oceania Championships – PT1 – 1st
2015 – Sunshine Coast ITU World Paratriathlon Event – PT1 – 1st 
2015 – Yokohama ITU World Paratriathlon Event – PT1 – 1st
2015 – Detroit ITU World Paratriathlon Event - PT1 - 2nd
2015 – ITU World Triathlon Grand Final Chicago – PT1 – 2nd
2016 – Devonport OTU Paratriathlon Oceania Championships – PT1 – 1st
2016 – Penrith ITU World Paratriathlon Event – PT1 – 1st
2017 – Rotterdam ITU World Championships Final – PTWC – 1st
2018 – Commonwealth Games – PWTC – 2nd
2018 - Gold Coast World Championships Final - 1st
2019  - Lausanne ITU World Championships Final - PTWC - 6th
2021 - Tokyo Summer Paralympics - PTWC - Did not finish

Athletics
Tapp is classified as a T54 athlete. Representing the Australian Capital Territory, she came fourth in the Women's 1500m at the 2016 Australian Athletics Championships. Tapp finished second to Christie Dawes in 2016 Gold Coast Marathon Women's Wheelchair race.

She was selected for the 2016 Rio Paralympics in athletics but she suffered a burn on her leg three weeks before she left for a training camp in Florida. The skin graft did not heal in time.

Recognition
2018 - Canberra Sport Awards -Athlete of the Year Para Sport
2018 -Triathlon Australia Female Para Triathlon Performance of the Year
2019 - Triathlon Australia Female Para Triathlon Performance of the Year

References

External links
World Triathlon Profile and Results
International Paralympic Committee Profile

1991 births
Commonwealth Games medallists in triathlon
Commonwealth Games silver medallists for Australia
Living people
Paralympic athletes of Australia
Paratriathletes at the 2020 Summer Paralympics
Paratriathletes of Australia
Triathletes at the 2018 Commonwealth Games
Medallists at the 2018 Commonwealth Games